John Mackey (28 August 1913 – 3 May 1989) was an Irish hurler who played as a right wing-forward at senior level for the Limerick county team.

Mackey is regarded as one of Limerick's all-time greatest players.  He made his first appearance for the team as a substitute during the 1932 championship and was a regular member of the starting fifteen until his retirement after the 1948 championship. During that time he won three All-Ireland medals, five Munster medals and five National League medals. He ended up as an All-Ireland runner-up on two occasions. 

At club level Mackey won a record-equaling fifteen county hurling championship and five county football championship medals with Ahane.

Mackey hailed from a hurling 'dynasty'. His father, John "Tyler" Mackey, was a former Limerick captain while his brothers, Mick and Paddy, also claimed All-Ireland honours.

References

1913 births
1989 deaths
Ahane hurlers
Ahane Gaelic footballers
All-Ireland Senior Hurling Championship winners
Dual players
Limerick inter-county hurlers
Munster inter-provincial hurlers